216433 Milianleo, provisional designation , is an Aeolia asteroid from the central region of the asteroid belt, approximately  in diameter. It was discovered 19 February 2009, by German amateur astronomer Erwin Schwab using a remote-controlled telescope at Tzec Maun Observatory  in Mayhill, New Mexico, United States. The asteroid was named after the discoverer's son, Milian Leo Schwab.

Orbit and classification 

Milianleo is an attributed member of the small Aeolia family, a small asteroid family of less than 300 known members, named after its parent body and largest member, 396 Aeolia. It orbits the Sun in the central main-belt at a distance of 2.4–3.1 AU once every 4 years and 6 months (1,658 days; semi-major axis of 2.74 AU). Its orbit has an eccentricity of 0.13 and an inclination of 3° with respect to the ecliptic.

On 25 December 2098, Milianleo is expected to pass 4,449,642 kilometers from the asteroid 704 Interamnia. It will pass it at a relative velocity of 7.12 kilometers per second.

Physical characteristics 

Milianleo is likely an X-type asteroid, based on its membership to the Aeolia family. When using a generic magnitude-to-diameter conversion, this asteroid measures approximately 1.6 kilometers in diameter, for an absolute magnitude of 16.5, and an assumed visual geometric albedo of 0.17, taken from the Aeolia family's parent body. As of 2018, no rotational lightcurve of Milianleo has been obtained from photometric observations. The body's rotation period, pole and shape remain unknown.

Naming 

This minor planet was named after Milian Leo Schwab, the first-born son of German amateur astronomer and discoverer Erwin Schwab. The approved naming citation was published by the Minor Planet Center 4 October 2009.

See also 
 Cloudcroft Observatory , owned by the Tzec Maun Foundation

References

External links 
 Asteroid Milianleo, Erwin Schwab
 Dictionary of Minor Planet Names, Google books
 Discovery Circumstances: Numbered Minor Planets (215001)-(220000) – Minor Planet Center
 
 

216433
Discoveries by Erwin Schwab
Named minor planets
20090219